Good Time Charley  is a 1927 American silent drama film produced and distributed by Warner Bros. and  directed by Michael Curtiz. The film apparently had a Vitaphone soundtrack of music and effects. It was considered to be a lost film. However, as of January 2021, the film is listed as extant at the Library of Congress.

Cast
 Helene Costello as Rosita Keene
 Warner Oland as Good Time Charley
 Clyde Cook as Bill Collins
 Montagu Love as John Hartwell
 Hugh Allan as John Hartwell Jr.
 Julanne Johnston as Elaine Keene
 Robert Dudley as Optometrist (uncredited)
 Gus Leonard as Card Player (uncredited)
 Johnnie Walker as Charles Garrick (uncredited)

References

External links
 

1927 films
American silent feature films
Films directed by Michael Curtiz
1927 drama films
American black-and-white films
Warner Bros. films
American drama films
Transitional sound drama films
1920s rediscovered films
Rediscovered American films
1920s American films
Silent American drama films